The Headsman: The Abbaye des Vignerons  is an 1833 novel by James Fenimore Cooper  set in Switzerland. The novel was inspired by one of Cooper's trips during his European travels in 1832. The novel is one of three of Cooper's "European" novels, following The Bravo and The Heidenmauer, all of which use the European setting to deal with socio-political contrast with American institutions.

Themes 
The novel explores a number of themes related to how society structures itself, including justice, authority, friendship, parental relationships, love and marriage.

Critical reception 
The novel is typically described for its socio-political commentary, but critics have argued the importance of treating the novel as part of Cooper's deliberate artistry.  Constance Ayers Denne describes this artistry as largely reflected in the novel's powerful structure and successful thematic treatment. Many critics who have read the novel for socio-political themes, were unsatisfied with its ending. Critic Thomas Palfrey argues that the novel has structural and thematic similarities to Balzac's works, such as Jesus Christ in Flanders.

References

External links 

Novels by James Fenimore Cooper
1833 American novels
Novels set in Switzerland